Minuscule 356 (in the Gregory-Aland numbering), α 255 (Soden), is a Greek minuscule manuscript of the New Testament, on parchment. Paleographically it has been assigned to the 12th century. 
Formerly it was labelled by 53a and 30p, and cited by Tischendorf as nscr.
It has marginalia.

Description 

The codex contains the text of the 2 Peter 2:4-3:18; 1 John 1:1-3:20 and Pauline epistles on 145 parchment leaves (size ) with some lacunae (1 Corinthians 11:7-15:56; Hebrews 11:27-13:25). The text is written in one column per page, in 24 lines per page, in very small and beautiful minuscule letters.
According to Scrivener it has 184 errors of itacism.

The text after 1 Timothy 6:5 was written by other hand, and far less careful. The manuscript exhibits throughout many abbreviations.

Text 

The Greek text of the codex is a representative of the Byzantine text-type. Aland placed it in Category V.

History 

The manuscript was given to the College in Testimonium grati animi by Samuel G. Wright, a member of the College, in 1598. It was examined by John Mill (Cant. 3), Wettstein (53a, 30p), Fenton Hort, Dean Burgon, and Scrivener. C. R. Gregory saw it in 1883.

The manuscript was added to the list of the New Testament manuscripts by Scholz (1794-1852).

Formerly it was labelled by 53a and 30p. In 1908 Gregory gave the number 356 to it.

The manuscript is currently housed at the Emmanuel College (I. 4. 35, MS 110) in Cambridge.

See also 

 List of New Testament minuscules
 Biblical manuscript
 Textual criticism

References

Further reading 

  (as n)

Greek New Testament minuscules
12th-century biblical manuscripts